La Musica Negra is the third and final album by the rock band Verbena, released in 2003 on Capitol Records. Although the album marked yet another personnel change with longtime member Ann Marie Griffin succeeded by Nick Daviston on bass guitar, the album was dedicated to her in the liner notes.

Track listing
All songs written by Scott Bondy except where noted.

"Way Out West" – 3:32 (Bondy and Les Nuby)
"Killing Floor (Get Down On It)" – 3:02
"I, Pistol" – 3:48
"It's Alright, It's Okay (Jesus Told Me So)" – 2:52
"All The Saints" – 3:19
"Camellia" – 4:06
"Me and Yr Sister" – 3:13
"White Grrls" – 3:28
"Ether" – 3:03
"Devil In Miss Jones" – 3:32
"Rememberer" – 4:17 (Bondy and Ed Buller)
"Dirty Goodbyes" – 3:47

Personnel
Scott Bondy – vocals and guitar
Nick Daviston – bass guitar
Les Nuby – drums
Emily Kokal – backing vocals on "Camellia"
Ambrosia Parsley – backing vocals on "Ether"

Production
Producer: Rob Schnapf
Engineer: Doug Boehm
Mixing: Rob Schnapf and Doug Boehm
Design: karissonwilker, inc.
Photography: David Lisznia

Verbena (band) albums
2003 albums
Capitol Records albums